Keats is an unincorporated community in Wildcat Township, Riley County, Kansas, United States.  As of the 2020 census, the population of the community and nearby areas was 96.  It is located five miles west of Manhattan.

History
Keats was founded in 1887, its name suggested by a railroad official who regarded the poet John Keats as a favorite. Keats grew from a smaller town named Wildcat with origins dating to 1860.

Demographics

For statistical purposes, the United States Census Bureau has defined Keats as a census-designated place (CDP).

Education
The community is served by Riley County USD 378 public school district.

References

Further reading

External links
 Riley County maps: Current, Historic, KDOT

Unincorporated communities in Riley County, Kansas
Unincorporated communities in Kansas